This is a list of public art in Brooklyn, in the United States. This list applies only to works of public art on permanent display in an outdoor public space. For example, this does not include artwork in museums. Public art may include sculptures, statues, monuments, memorials, murals, and mosaics.

Brooklyn
Public art in New York City